The 1999 Saxony state election was held on 19 September 1999 to elect the members of the 3rd Landtag of Saxony. The incumbent Christian Democratic Union (CDU) government led by Minister-President Kurt Biedenkopf retained its majority and continued in office.

Parties
The table below lists parties represented in the 2nd Landtag of Saxony.

Opinion polling

Election result

|-
! colspan="2" | Party
! Votes
! %
! +/-
! Seats 
! +/-
! Seats %
|-
| bgcolor=| 
| align=left | Christian Democratic Union (CDU)
| align=right| 1,231,254
| align=right| 56.9
| align=right| 1.2
| align=right| 76
| align=right| 1
| align=right| 63.3
|-
| bgcolor=| 
| align=left | Party of Democratic Socialism (PDS)
| align=right| 480,317
| align=right| 22.2
| align=right| 5.7
| align=right| 30
| align=right| 9
| align=right| 25.0
|-
| bgcolor=| 
| align=left | Social Democratic Party (SPD)
| align=right| 232,311
| align=right| 10.7
| align=right| 5.9
| align=right| 14
| align=right| 8
| align=right| 11.7
|-
! colspan=8|
|-
| bgcolor=| 
| align=left | Alliance 90/The Greens (Grüne)
| align=right| 55,609
| align=right| 2.6
| align=right| 1.5
| align=right| 0
| align=right| ±0
| align=right| 0
|-
| 
| align=left | Pro Deutsche Mark (Pro DM)
| align=right| 46,469
| align=right| 2.1
| align=right| 2.1
| align=right| 0
| align=right| ±0
| align=right| 0
|-
| bgcolor=| 
| align=left | The Republicans (REP)
| align=right| 32,793
| align=right| 1.5
| align=right| 0.2
| align=right| 0
| align=right| ±0
| align=right| 0
|-
| bgcolor=| 
| align=left | National Democratic Party (NPD)
| align=right| 29,593
| align=right| 1.4
| align=right| 1.4
| align=right| 0
| align=right| ±0
| align=right| 0
|-
| bgcolor=| 
| align=left | Free Democratic Party (FDP)
| align=right| 23,369
| align=right| 1.1
| align=right| 0.6
| align=right| 0
| align=right| ±0
| align=right| 0
|-
| bgcolor=|
| align=left | Others
| align=right| 32,357
| align=right| 1.5
| align=right| 
| align=right| 0
| align=right| ±0
| align=right| 0
|-
! align=right colspan=2| Total
! align=right| 2,164,072
! align=right| 100.0
! align=right| 
! align=right| 120
! align=right| ±0
! align=right| 
|-
! align=right colspan=2| Voter turnout
! align=right| 
! align=right| 61.1
! align=right| 2.7
! align=right| 
! align=right| 
! align=right| 
|}

Elections, 1999
1999 elections in Germany
September 1999 events in Europe